Francisco Javier Gamboa Chávez (born September 18, 1978) is a Mexican football manager.

References

1978 births
Living people
Mexican football managers
People from Chihuahua City